2,4,6-Trinitrophenylmethylnitramine commonly referred to as tetryl (C7H5N5O8) is an explosive compound used to make detonators and explosive booster charges.

Tetryl is a nitramine booster explosive, though its use has been largely superseded by RDX. Tetryl is a sensitive secondary high explosive used as a booster, a small charge placed next to the detonator in order to propagate detonation into the main explosive charge.

Chemical properties
Tetryl is a yellow crystalline solid powder material, practically insoluble in water but soluble in acetone, benzene and other solvents. When tetryl is heated, it first melts, then decomposes and explodes. It burns readily and is more easily detonated than ammonium picrate or TNT, being about as sensitive as picric acid. It is detonated by friction, shock, or spark. It remains stable at all temperatures which may be encountered in storage. It is generally used in the form of pressed pellets, and has been approved as the standard bursting charge for small-caliber projectiles, since it gives much better fragmentation than TNT. It has an explosive velocity of 23,600–23,900 feet per second (7200–7300 m/s). Tetryl is the basis for the service tetryl blasting caps necessary for positive detonation of TNT. A mixture of mercury fulminate and potassium chlorate is included in the cap to ensure detonation of tetryl.

Environmental fate
The most toxic ordnance compounds, tetryl and 1,3,5-TNB, are also the most degradable. Therefore, these chemicals are expected to be short-lived in nature, and environmental impacts would not be expected in areas that are not currently subject to chronic inputs of these chemicals. Tetryl decomposes rapidly in methanol/water solutions, as well as with heat. All aqueous samples expected to contain tetryl should be diluted with acetonitrile prior to filtration and acidified to pH < 3. All samples expected to contain tetryl should not be exposed to temperatures above room temperature. In addition, degradation products of tetryl appear as a shoulder on the 2,4,6-TNT peak. Peak heights rather than peak areas should be used when tetryl is present in concentrations that are significant relative to the concentration of 2,4,6-TNT.

History 

Tetryl was used mainly during World Wars I and II and later conflicts. Tetryl is usually used on its own, though can sometimes be found in compositions such as tetrytol. Tetryl is no longer manufactured or used in the United States, but can still be found in legacy munitions such as the M14 anti-personnel landmine.

Production 

Tetryl is produced by slowly mixing dimethylaniline with concentrated nitric acid in the presence of sulfuric acid.

Health concerns

Although tetryl is among the most toxic explosive compounds, it is very short-lived. This combined with the fact that the health impacts of this compound are largely unstudied, not much is known about any health problems that this compound may cause.

Epidemiological data shows that tetryl has most effect on the skin, acting as a strong irritant. Symptoms of skin sensitization such as dermatitis, itch, erythema, etc. may occur. Tetryl can also affect mucous membranes, the upper respiratory tract, and possibly the liver.

See also 

 Hexanitrobenzene
 Trinitrotoluene
 RE factor

References 

 Cooper, Paul W., Explosives Engineering, New York: Wiley-VCH, 1996.

External links 
 Tetryl, Agency for Toxic Substances and Disease Registry
 Occupational Safety and Health Guideline for Tetryl , Occupational Safety & Health Administration

Explosive chemicals
Nitroamines